The Amsterdam Tournament  is a pre-season football tournament held for club teams from around the world, hosted at the Amsterdam ArenA. The 2003 tournament was contested by Ajax, Galatasaray, Internazionale and Liverpool on 1 August and 3 August 2003. Ajax won the tournament for the third year in a row.

Table

NB: An extra point is awarded for each goal scored.

Matches

Day 1

Day 2

References

2003 
2003–04 in Dutch football
2003–04 in Italian football
2003–04 in Turkish football
2003–04 in English football